Evangelist may refer to:

Religion
 Four Evangelists, the authors of the canonical Christian Gospels 
 Evangelism, publicly preaching the Gospel with the intention of spreading the teachings of Jesus Christ
 Evangelist (Anglican Church), a commissioned office in the ministry of many Anglican provinces
 Evangelist, also known as an itinerant preacher in Methodism
 Evangelist (Latter Day Saints), an ordained office in the ministry in the Latter Day Saint movement
 Evangelist, a character in John Bunyan's 1678 book The Pilgrim's Progress
 Presiding Patriarch, a church-wide leadership office within the priesthood of Latter Day Saints
 Quorum of Seventy Evangelists, a leadership body in The Church of Jesus Christ (Bickertonite)

Music 
 Evangelist (Bach), tenor part in Bach's oratorios and Passions who narrates the Bible
 The narrator in works by other composers, e.g. Heinrich Schütz's Weinachtshistorie, Matthäuspassion, Lukaspassion
 Der Evangelimann, an opera by Austrian composer Wilhelm Kienzl
 The Evangelist (album), an album by Robert Forster

Other
The Evangelist (1916 film), a silent film directed by Barry O'Neil
 The Evangelist (1924 film), a German silent drama film
 The Evangelist, journal of Walter Scott
 The Evangelists, a 1992 play by Romanian author Alina Mungiu-Pippidi
 The Three Evangelists, a 1995 novel by French author Fred Vargas
 Evangelistas Islets, at the west mouth of the Strait of Magellan
 Technology evangelist, a person who attempts to build support for a given technology

See also
Evangelicalism
Evangelical Lutheran
Evangelists (disambiguation)